Tweed is an electoral district of the Legislative Assembly in the Australian state of New South Wales. It is represented by Geoff Provest of The Nationals. It is located in the Tweed Valley and eastern Tweed Shire, including Tweed Heads, Kingscliff, Fingal Head, Chinderah, Cudgen, Bogangar, Pottsville and Burringbar.

History
Tweed was first created with the end of multi-member districts in 1894. In 1904, it was abolished with the reduction in the size of the Legislative Assembly, after Federation.  The region was part of Richmond from 1904 to 1913, Byron from 1913 until 1988 when the district was renamed Murwillumbah. In 1999 the district was renamed Tweed.

Members for Tweed

Election results

References

Tweed
1894 establishments in Australia
Tweed
1904 disestablishments in Australia
Tweed
1999 establishments in Australia
Tweed
Tweed Heads, New South Wales